Fractured Dimensions is an album by American jazz double bassist William Parker, which was recorded live during the Berlin Total Music Meeting in 1999 and released on the German FMP label in 2003.

The band originally billed to play was the free jazz quartet Other Dimensions In Music, but Rashid Bakr's unavailability led to the fortuitous last-minute substitution of Alan Silva.

Reception

In his review for AllMusic, François Couture states "Digital synthesizers are not often heard in free improvisation contexts. They sound a bit cold and intrusive. But Silva's playing is so colorful that one quickly leaves his apprehensions behind."

The Penguin Guide to Jazz says that "the absence of percussion, unusual sound of a digital synth and occasional presence of two trumpeters give the music an unusual sonority."

Track listing
All compositions by Parker, Campbell, Carter & Silva
 "Figures Standing in the Door" - 6:32 
 "Eternal Flower" - 3:38 
 "End of Famina" - 7:39
 "Vermeer" - 10:12
 "Acrosses Rain" - 33:48 
 "Sonnet For Armstrong" - 16:14

Personnel
William Parker - bass
Roy Campbell - trumpet, flugelhorn
Daniel Carter - flute, clarinet, alto sax, trumpet
Alan Silva - synthesizer, piano

References

2003 albums
FMP Records live albums
William Parker (musician) live albums